World Film Carnival Singapore (WFCS) is an IMDb monthly live screening International Film Festival. It is an annual award screening event that takes place in Singapore. It was started in the year 2019 by Shailik Bhaumik.

The majority of monthly award winners are screened in Singapore each month and evaluated by Cult Critic before competing for the Golden Merlion Awards (Best film of the year). The champions of each year receive a trophy, certificate, and honors.

Awardees 
The award is given each year for significant movies and people in a variety of categories.

2022 
Min Tai
Lorenzo Muscoso
Yarana 2.0 as best film
Hamari Corona Fighter as best film
"Potra"
"Di Qua Trung Bong Chet" won Critics Choice Award
"Becoming Black Lawyers" won Outstanding Achievement Award
"Dennaa" best Odia film
"Sorry"
Lachhi
Fleeting Structure

2021 
Fattah Amin best actor for 'Miimaland'
Russ Emanuel, best director for 'Occupants'
Erik Thompson, best actor for 'The Dirty Hands Man'
Prachee Shah Paandya, best actress for 'On the Seesaw'
Robert Picardo, best actor for 'Occupants'
Tanya Desai for the film 'ZERO KILOMETER'
George Chiang
Marina Tetarić Prusec for the film “Flight to Eternity”
Vinay Prataprao Deshmukh for "Na Jaane Kyun"
"Unmasking" for best Pakistani short film
"The Art Of Life"

2020 
Ken Sagoes, best director for 'The McHenry Trial - Don't Judge a Kid by Their Hoodie'
Manasanamaha, best short film
Taher Ali Baig, Outstanding Achievement Award
"Tale of Rising Rani" best feature film
"Old Hearts Cafe" best experimental films

2019 
Simonna
Outstanding Achievement Award to Debut Filmmaker "Niklas Goslar" for 'Mother of Tibetans'
Critic's Choice Award for "The Champ of Champs"

References 

Film festivals established in 2019
Film festivals in Singapore
2019 establishments in Singapore